Heike Warnicke (née Schalling, later Sinaki, born 1 June 1966) is a German speed skater who competed in the 1992 and 1994 Winter Olympics.

She was born in Weimar.

In 1992 she won the silver medal in the 3000 metres event as well as in the 5000 metres competition, both times behind Gunda Niemann. In the 1500 metres contest she finished eighth.

Two years later, at the Winter Olympics in Lillehammer, she finished 14th in the 5000 metres event, 15th in the 3000 metres competition, and 26th in the 1500 metres contest.

External links
 

1966 births
Living people
Sportspeople from Weimar
People from Bezirk Erfurt
German female speed skaters
Olympic speed skaters of Germany
Speed skaters at the 1992 Winter Olympics
Speed skaters at the 1994 Winter Olympics
Medalists at the 1992 Winter Olympics
Olympic medalists in speed skating
Olympic silver medalists for Germany
Universiade medalists in speed skating
World Allround Speed Skating Championships medalists
Universiade gold medalists for Germany
Competitors at the 1991 Winter Universiade
20th-century German women